Arcade Theater may refer to:
Arcade Theater (Los Angeles), originally the Pantages Theatre (built 1910), a vaudeville theater and movie palace, within the Broadway Theater District in Downtown Los Angeles, a historic district on the  National Register of Historic Places listings in Los Angeles, California. 
Arcade Theater (Lake Charles, Louisiana), formerly listed on the National Register of Historic Places in Calcasieu Parish, Louisiana
Arcade Theater (Slidell, Louisiana), listed on the  National Register of Historic Places in St. Tammany Parish, Louisiana
Arcade Theatre (Jacksonville)